The Yamaguchi Hotel is a historic building in Portland, Oregon, in the United States. Located at the intersection of 4th Avenue and Glisan Street in the northwest Portland part of the Old Town Chinatown neighborhood, the building is owned by Blanchet House. Demolition on the structure began in 2023.

References 

Buildings and structures in Portland, Oregon
Northwest Portland, Oregon
Old Town Chinatown